Appathava Aattaya Pottutanga is a 2021 Tamil language drama film directed by Stephen Rangaraj and starring Chandrahasan and Sheela in the lead roles. Produced by GB Studio Films, it was released on 8 October 2021.

Cast 
Chandrahasan as Ramasamy
Sheela as Meenakshi
Ilavarasu
Delhi Ganesh as Suthanthiram
Kathadi Ramamurthy as Seenu
Shanmugasundaram as Sokkalingam
Vinodh Munna 
Dinesh (special appearance)

Plot
The story about 4 old men and 1 old lady. One of the old men named Ramasamy (Chandrahasan) and the old lady named Meenakshi are left in old age home by their respective children. Both of them decided to marry so that can relive from their loneliness during  old age.  So that, the 3 friends of Ramasamy (Delhi Ganesh, Kathadi Ramamurthy & Shanmugasundaram help them to elope from the old age home and get married although their children oppose. The cat and dog search between the old couple and their children are continued until they seek help from police to get married. What happened next, will they get married or not ? forms the crux of the story

Production 
Appathava Aattaya Pottutanga began production in 2016, with Kamal Haasan's elder brother Chandrahasan appearing in his first lead role. The story narrated the tale of how the relatives of senior citizens go against a love story taking place in an elderly home. Sheela, the mother of actor Vikranth, played the female lead role, while several other senior actors including Kathadi Ramamurthy and Shanmugasundaram were cast in supporting roles. Post-production began in January 2017, and Chandrahasan died in March 2017.

Release 
The film was released, after a four year delay, on the SonyLIV streaming platform on 8 October 2021. Avinash Ramachandran of Cinema Express gave the film a mixed review stating it was "a no-frills tale about the twilight years". A critic from Dinamalar gave the film two out of five stars. OTTPlay noted "had the makers focused on a better screenplay, the decent plot would have worked, given the number of experienced artists in the film".

References

External links  
 

2021 films
2020s Tamil-language films
Indian drama films
2021 drama films